Andrei Yuryevich Sokolov (born 23 February 1972) is a Soviet/Latvian chess player. He was awarded the International Master title in 1992.

Biography
In the late 1980s and early 1990s Andrei Sokolov was one of the best chess players in Latvia. He regularly participated in the Latvian Chess Championship. Best results - 2nd place in 1990 (won Edvīns Ķeņģis) and in 1994 (won Valerij Zhuravliov).
Andrei Sokolov played for Latvia in Chess Olympiads:
 In 1994, at reserve board in the 31st Chess Olympiad in Moscow (+1 −1 =6);
 In 1996, at fourth board in the 32nd Chess Olympiad in Yerevan (+1 −1 =6).
Andrei Sokolov played for Latvia in European Team Chess Championship:
 In 1992, at fourth board in Debrecen (+0 −1 =6);
Since 2002 Sokolov rarely participated in serious chess tournaments, but keep place in the top ten players in Latvia according to the FIDE rating. He currently live in Veliky Novgorod and playing in fast chess tournaments. In 2013 Sokolov won the Open Championship of Novgorod Oblast in rapid and blitz chess.

References

External links
 
 
 

1972 births
Living people
Latvian people of Russian descent
Latvian chess players
Soviet chess players
Chess International Masters
Chess Olympiad competitors